In Greek mythology, Eurotas (Ancient Greek: Εὐρώτας) was a king of Laconia.

Family 

Eurotas was the son of King Myles of Laconia and grandson of Lelex, eponymous ancestor of the Leleges. The Bibliotheca gave a slight variant of the mythological generation of Eurotas, who was described as the son of Lelex, born from the ground, by his wife Cleocharia. In some accounts, his mother was called Taygete instead. Eurotas had no male heir but he did have two daughters Sparta and Tiasa by Clete.

Mythology 
Eurotas bequeathed the kingdom to Lacedaemon, the son of Zeus and Taygete, after whom Mount Taygetus was named, according to Pausanias. This Lacedaemon married his daughter Sparta and renamed the state after his wife.

Pausanias says: "It was Eurotas who channelled away the marsh-water from the plains by cutting through to the sea, and when the land was drained he called the river which was left running there the Eurotas." The "cutting through" is seen by Pausanias’ translator and commentator, Peter Levy, S.J., as an explanation of Eurotas (or Vrodamas) Canyon, a ravine north of Skala where the river has cut through the foothills of Taygetus after changing direction to the west of the valley.

Eurotas in art
River gods are typically represented in Greek art, such as coin motifs, as figures with the bodies of bulls and the faces of humans. If only the face appears, they might wear horns and have wavy hair or be accompanied by fish. Claudius Aelianus states that the Eurotas and other rivers are like bulls.

Notes

References 

 Pausanias, Description of Greece with an English Translation by W.H.S. Jones, Litt.D., and H.A. Ormerod, M.A., in 4 Volumes. Cambridge, MA, Harvard University Press; London, William Heinemann Ltd. 1918. Online version at the Perseus Digital Library
 Pausanias, Graeciae Descriptio. 3 vols. Leipzig, Teubner. 1903.  Greek text available at the Perseus Digital Library.
 Pseudo-Apollodorus, The Library with an English Translation by Sir James George Frazer, F.B.A., F.R.S. in 2 Volumes, Cambridge, MA, Harvard University Press; London, William Heinemann Ltd. 1921. Online version at the Perseus Digital Library. Greek text available from the same website.

External links

Mythological kings of Laconia
Kings in Greek mythology
Laconian characters in Greek mythology
Laconian mythology
Princes in Greek mythology